This is a list of rivers in Mozambique. This list is arranged by drainage basin, with respective tributaries indented under each larger stream's name.

Indian Ocean

Ruvuma River
Lugenda River
Lureco River
Luatize River
Lotchese River
Luambala River
Luchimua River
Mandimbe River
Ngalamu River
Chiulezi River
Luchulingo River
Messinge River (Msinje River)
Messalo River
Montepuez River
Lúrio River
Mecuburi River
Sanhute River
Monapo River
Mugincual River
Melúli River
Ligonha River
Melela River
Raraga River
Licungo River
Cuácua River (Rio dos Bons Sinais) (Quelimane River)
Licuare River
Lualua River
Mucarau River
Zambezi River
Chinde River (distributary)
Inhaombe River
Zangue River
Nhamapasa River
Shire River
Lake Malawi
Msinje River
Pompué River
Luenha River
Mazowe River
Ruya River (Luia River)
Gairezi River (Cauresi River)
Revúboé River
Luia River
Cherisse River
Muangadeze River
Capoche River
Luangua River (Duangua River)
Mucanha River
Messenguézi River
Metamboa River
Manyame River (Panhame River) (Hunyani River)
Angwa River
Luangwa River
Micelo River
Mupa River
Chinizíua River
Sangussi River
Pungwe River
Vunduzi River
Buzi River
Revué River
Lucite River
Gorongosa River
Muar River
Save River (Sabi River)
Govuro River
Inharrime River
Limpopo River
Changane River
Olifants River
Shingwidzi River
Mwenezi River
Komati River (Incomati River)
Mazimechopes River
Nwanedzi River
Nwaswitsontso River
Sabie River
Matola River
Umbuluzi River River
Tembe River
Maputo River (Lusutfu River)
Pongola River
Tumbulumundo River

References
Prentice-Hall, Inc., American World Atlas 1985
United Nations 2004
GEOnet Names Server

Mozambique
Rivers